The sport of football in the country of Syria is run by the Syrian Arab Federation for Football. The association administers the national football team as well as the Syrian Premier League. Football is the most popular sport in the country.

Tishreen SC, Al Wahda SC, Al-Jaish SC and Al-Ittihad are amongst the most popular clubs in the country. All teams compete in the Syrian Premier League, the highest tier of Syrian football.

Domestic football

On 27 November 2004, Al-Jaish won the 2004 AFC Cup, which is similar to the European UEFA Cup. Al Jaish was the first Syrian club to win a continental title, making it all the more interesting that the final opponent was Al Wahda, facing two Syrian clubs in the final. Both games took place in Abbasiyyin Stadium. In the first leg, in which Al Wahda was officially at home, Al Jaish won 3–2; the second leg ended 1–0 for Al Wahda. The fact that the first game was scored as an away game for Al Jaish, the record champions decided on the away goals rule the "Battle of Damascus" for themselves. Both clubs participated in 2005 in the AFC Champions League.

In the Arab Club Champions Cup and the Arab Cup Winners' Cup forerunners of the Arab Champions League, it was Al Jaish who held up the banner of Syrian club football: between 1998 and 2000, the finals were scored twice in both competitions. but had to be defeated every four times.

In the Asian Champions League (AFC Champions League), Al-Karamah achieved the 2006 AFC Champions League second place. In the final, the team was unfortunately defeated by Jeonbuk Motors of South Korea (2–0 in Korea, 2–1 at home). In 2009, Al-Karama reached the AFC Cup final, but lost 1–1 to Al-Kuwait in the 2009 AFC Cup.

Al-Ittihad won the 2010 AFC Cup against Al-Qadsia to become the second Syrian team to win the AFC Cup trophy.

Stadiums

Syria has a total of 35 football stadiums spread around the country. The main stadium used to be Abbasiyyin Stadium in Damascus, but when the Aleppo International Stadium was built, it replaced it.

National team

The Syrian national team won the 1957 Pan Arab Games, 1987 Mediterranean Games and 2012 WAFF Championship, yet has never qualified for a football World Cup. Even in the Asian Cup so far succeeded little. After all, the youth selection participated three times (1989, 1995 and 2005) at the FIFA Youth World Cup and reached in 2005 the knockout stages. Syria U20 managed to win the 1994 AFC Youth Championship by beating Japan U20 2–1 in the final. The U-17 selection of the country qualified in 2007 for the World Cup in this age group and was also able to celebrate the knockout stages.

In addition to the senior national team of men and various youth teams, there is also a women's national team.

Women's football

The first women's football team in Syria, the Levant and the Middle East was founded in Aleppo in 1950. For a long time there was neither an organized women's league nor an organized cup competition, but for years there have been regular (unofficial) tournaments by women's teams. 

Since the end of July 2006, the first official Syrian women's football championship runs in the form of a league with 7 teams. In addition, there is a women's national team, which, however, has not played any official international matches at FIFA level until the 2018 AFC Women's Asian Cup qualification.

See also
List of football stadiums in Syria
List of football clubs in Syria

References

Football in Syria